For Members Only is an album by American jazz organist Shirley Scott recorded in 1963 for the Impulse! label.

Reception
The Allmusic review awarded the album 4½ stars.

Track listing
All compositions by Shirley Scott except as indicated

 "Southern Comfort" (Oliver Nelson) — 5:40
 "Blue Piano" (Ellington) — 3:45
 "Freedom Dance" (Nelson) — 4:53
 "Toys in the Attic" (Duning) — 2:51
 "Blues for Members" — 5:50
 "I've Grown Accustomed to Her Face" (Lerner, Loewe) — 4:45
 "Marchin' to Riverside" — 3:15
 "We're Goin' Home" — 7:14
Recorded  on August 22 (tracks 5-8) and August 24 (tracks 1-4), 1963.

Personnel
Shirley Scott — organ 
Thad Jones, Jerry Kail, Tom McIntosh, Jimmy Nottingham, Ernie Royal — trumpet  (tracks 1-4)
Jimmy Cleveland, Quentin Jackson, Thomas Mitchell — trombone  (tracks 1-4)
Eddy Manson — harmonica  (tracks 1-4)
Mundell Lowe — guitar (tracks 1-4)  
Art Davis (tracks 1-4), Earl May (tracks 5-8) — bass
Jimmy Cobb (tracks 5-8), Ed Shaughnessy (tracks 1-4) — drums
Joe Venuto — percussion (tracks 1-4)
Oliver Nelson — arranger, conductor (tracks 1-4)

References

Impulse! Records albums
English phrases
Albums arranged by Oliver Nelson
Albums produced by Bob Thiele
Shirley Scott albums
1963 albums
Albums conducted by Oliver Nelson